"Let Me Down Easy" is a song by Scottish pop/rock singer Paolo Nutini. The song was released as the second single from his third studio album, Caustic Love. It was released on 17 June 2014. 
This song is a blended duet incorporating the song with the same name by Bettye LaVette. It is featured in the movie Alien: Covenant.

Charts

Weekly charts

Year-end charts

References

2014 songs
2014 singles
Paolo Nutini songs
Atlantic Records UK singles